"I Don't Wanna Care Right Now" is a song by American rapper Lupe Fiasco, featuring MDMA. The song appears on his third studio album Lasers.

Music video
The song's official music video was released on December 2, 2011, on YouTube. The video was filmed during a concert at Iowa State University.

Chart performance
"I Don't Wanna Care Right Now" debuted at #12 on the Bubbling Under Hot 100 Singles chart.

References

Lupe Fiasco songs
Songs written by Lupe Fiasco
Song recordings produced by the Audibles
2010 songs
Songs written by Dominic Jordan
Songs written by James Giannos
Songs written by Poo Bear